Arthrobacter parietis is a bacterium species from the genus Arthrobacter which has been isolated from biofilms which covered the Servilia tomb from the Roman necropolis of Carmona in Carmona, Spain.

References

Further reading

External links
Type strain of Arthrobacter parietis at BacDive -  the Bacterial Diversity Metadatabase

Bacteria described in 2005
Micrococcaceae